Bossiaea heterophylla, commonly known as variable bossiaea, is a species of flowering plant in the family Fabaceae and is endemic to south-eastern Australia. It is a variable shrub with flattened stems, egg-shaped to linear leaves, and yellow and dark red flowers.

Description

Taxonomy
Bossiaea heterophylla was first formally described in 1800 by Étienne Pierre Ventenat in his book, Description des Plantes Nouvelles et peu connues, cultivées dans le Jardin de J.M. Cels, from specimens grown by Jacques Philippe Martin Cels, in turn grown from material collected from Botany Bay in 1792. The specific epithet (heterophylla) means "unequal-leaved".

Distribution and habitat
Variable bossiaea grows in a variety of habitats, usually in sandy soils and occurs on the coast and nearby tablelands south from Bundaberg in Queensland, through New South Wales to Victoria as far west as Rosedale. It also occurs in two small populations in northern Tasmania.

Conservation status
This bossiaea is listed as "endangered" in Tasmania under the Tasmanian Government Threatened Species Protection Act 1995.

References

heterophylla
Mirbelioids
Flora of New South Wales
Flora of Queensland
Flora of Victoria (Australia)
Flora of Tasmania
Taxa named by Étienne Pierre Ventenat
Plants described in 1800